The La Ngà River is a river of southern Vietnam. It is a major tributary of the Đồng Nai River, which it joins at Trị An Lake, and therefore part of one of the largest river systems in Vietnam. One of its tributaries in Bình Thuận Province supports a hydro-power plant: the Hàm Thuận – Đa Mi Hydroelectric Power Complex.

References

Rivers of Lâm Đồng province
Rivers of Đồng Nai province
Rivers of Bình Thuận province
Rivers of Vietnam